On the Spot was a BBC National Lottery game show broadcast on BBC One from 29 July to 2 September 2000. It was hosted by Des O'Connor.

Ratings

References

External links

2000 British television series debuts
2000 British television series endings
BBC television game shows
British game shows about lotteries
2000s British game shows